Glen Oaks High School (GOHS) is located in Merrydale, unincorporated East Baton Rouge Parish, Louisiana, United States, near the city of Baton Rouge. The school, opened in 1960, is part of East Baton Rouge Parish Public Schools. The current principal is Edward Hunter.

Feeder patterns
Glen Oaks serves Merrydale and sections of Baton Rouge.

The following elementary schools feed into Glen Oaks: 
 Glen Oaks Park
 Lanier
 Merrydale
 Claiborne (partial)
 Sharon Hills (partial)
 Forest Heights Academy of Excellence
 Howell Park & Brookstown

The following middle schools feed into Glen Oaks:
 Glen Oaks

School uniforms
All student must wear uniforms: 9th Grade: Red or Black, 10-12th Grade: Red or Black

Athletics
The Glen Oaks High Panthers compete in LHSAA Class 3A athletics. The school's mascot is the Panther and school colors are red, black, and white.

Championships
The school is best known for its boys and girls basketball programs, as well as their track and field programs. The basketball programs have won multiple state championships and tournament titles since the 1990s and the track and field teams have won state titles starting in the 2000s.

Band
GOHS panther marching band is the one of the largest student organizations on campus.  The band and the Pantherettes have a long tradition of winning "Battle of the Bands" in South Louisiana and performing at parades and other special events in the region.

Notable alumni
 Gary Chambers, activist and 2022 US Senate candidate
 Bob Didier, Former MLB player (Atlanta Braves, Detroit Tigers, Boston Red Sox)
 Ryan Francis, former USC point guard; murdered near GOHS
 Steven Jyles, former starting quarterback for the University of Louisiana-Monroe and currently of the Saskatchewan Roughriders
 Gabe Northern, former NFL defensive end & linebacker with the Buffalo Bills and Minnesota Vikings
 Heishma Northern, former Southern University defensive back and current head coach at Prairie View A&M University; brother of Gabe Northern
 Marcus Randall, former LSU quarterback; brother of former Glen Oaks & Southern University quarterback Eric Randall

References

External links

 

Public high schools in Louisiana
Schools in East Baton Rouge Parish, Louisiana
1960 establishments in Louisiana
Educational institutions established in 1960